Roanoke High School was a Public School in Martin County, North Carolina. It was one of four high schools in Martin County Schools. Because of consolidation, the school's student population was merged with Bear Grass High School in 2010–2011.  Roanoke High School and Bear Grass High School merged to form South Creek High School in 2010.

Notable alumni 
Marcus Crandell, Canadian Football League quarterback

References 

Public high schools in North Carolina
Schools in Martin County, North Carolina
Educational institutions disestablished in 2010
Educational institutions established in 1975